The 2020 Blackwater Elite season was the sixth season of the franchise in the Philippine Basketball Association (PBA).

Key dates
 December 8: The 2019 PBA draft took place on Robinsons Place Manila.
 March 11: The PBA postpones the season due to the threat of the coronavirus.

Draft picks

Special draft

Regular draft

Roster

Philippine Cup

Eliminations

Standings

Game log

|-bgcolor=bbffbb
| 1
| October 12
| NorthPort
| W 96–89
| Sumang, Trollano (17)
| Don Trollano (10)
| 5 players (2)
| AUF Sports Arena & Cultural Center
| 1–0
|-bgcolor=ffcccc
| 2
| October 15
| Ginebra
| L 99–103
| Don Trollano (23)
| Don Trollano (10)
| Sumang, Daquioag (4)
| AUF Sports Arena & Cultural Center
| 1–1
|-bgcolor=bbffbb
| 3
| October 17
| NLEX
| W 98–88
| Canaleta, Trollano (18)
| Don Trollano (11)
| Ed Daquioag (8)
| AUF Sports Arena & Cultural Center
| 2–1
|-bgcolor=ffcccc
| 4
| October 20
| Alaska
| L 82–120
| Ed Daquioag (18)
| Jonjon Gabriel (7)
| Mike Tolomia (7)
| AUF Sports Arena & Cultural Center
| 2–2
|-bgcolor=ffcccc
| 5
| October 22
| TNT
| L 96–109
| Don Trollano (23)
| Mac Belo (8)
| Ed Daquioag (7)
| AUF Sports Arena & Cultural Center
| 2–3

|-bgcolor=ffcccc
| 6
| November 3
| San Miguel
| L 88–90 OT
| Ed Daquioag (20)
| KG Canaleta (10)
| Mike Tolomia (5)
| AUF Sports Arena & Cultural Center
| 2–4
|-bgcolor=ffcccc
| 7
| November 4
| Meralco
| L 85–89
| Don Trollano (16)
| Don Trollano (6)
| Roi Sumang (5)
| AUF Sports Arena & Cultural Center
| 2–5
|-bgcolor=ffcccc
| 8
| November 6
| Terrafirma
| L 101–110
| KG Canaleta (29)
| Don Trollano (13)
| Roi Sumang (5)
| AUF Sports Arena & Cultural Center
| 2–6
|-bgcolor=ffcccc
| 9
| November 8
| Rain or Shine
| L 71–82
| Mac Belo (15)
| Roi Sumang (10)
| Roi Sumang (7)
| AUF Sports Arena & Cultural Center
| 2–7
|-bgcolor=ffcccc
| 10
| November 9
| Phoenix
| L 95–100
| KG Canaleta (21)
| Trollano, Belo (8)
| Roi Sumang (5)
| AUF Sports Arena & Cultural Center
| 2–8
|-bgcolor=ffcccc
| 11
| November 11
| Magnolia
| L 80–95
| KG Canaleta (14)
| Don Trollano (10)
| Roi Sumang (5)
| AUF Sports Arena & Cultural Center
| 2–9

Transactions

Trades

Preseason

Free agents

Rookie Signings

Other Signings

References

Blackwater Bossing seasons
Blackwater Elite